Kobald may refer to:
Kobald (wrestler), American professional wrestler
Christoph Kobald (born 1997), Austrian professional footballer

See also
Kobold, sprite from Germanic folklore
Cobalt, chemical element